Monster Ballads: Platinum Edition is a compilation album. It features many power ballads, most of which appeared on previous Monster Ballads installations or related albums.

Track listing

Disc 1
"Heaven" - Warrant
"I Remember You" - Skid Row
"When the Children Cry" - White Lion
"Headed for a Heartbreak" - Winger
"High Enough" - Damn Yankees
"Love of a Lifetime" - FireHouse
"To Be with You" - Mr. Big
"Don't Close Your Eyes" - Kix
"When I See You Smile" - Bad English
"Carrie" - Europe
"Fly High Michelle" - Enuff Z'nuff
"Love Is on the Way" - Saigon Kick
"The Flame" - Cheap Trick
"House of Pain" - Faster Pussycat
"Miles Away" - Winger
"If You Needed Somebody" - Bad Company

Disc 2
"Every Rose Has Its Thorn" - Poison
"Don't Know What You Got (Till It's Gone)" - Cinderella
"Fly to the Angels" - Slaughter
"Silent Lucidity" - Queensrÿche
"Love Song" - Tesla
"Is This Love?" - Whitesnake
"Forever" - Kiss
"I'll Never Let You Go" - Steelheart
"Tracy's Song/Only Time Will Tell" - Nelson
"Wind of Change" - Scorpions
"The Angel Song" - Great White
"I'll See You in My Dreams" - Giant
"More Than Words" - Extreme
"When I'm with You" - Sheriff
"The Ballad of Jayne" - L.A. Guns
"Honestly" - Stryper

Retail Version
"I Remember You" - Skid Row - 5:14
"Heaven" - Warrant - 3:56
"Every Rose Has Its Thorn" - Poison - 4:20
"Fly to the Angels" - Slaughter - 4:31
"Don't Know What You Got (Till It's Gone)" - Cinderella - 5:49
"When the Children Cry" - White Lion - 4:19
"Headed for a Heartbreak" - Winger - 4:00
"Forever" - Kiss - 3:49
"Love of a Lifetime" - FireHouse - 4:48
"High Enough" - Damn Yankees - 4:17
"Is This Love" - Whitesnake - 4:42
"Love Song" - Tesla - 4:04
"To Be with You" - Mr. Big - 3:20
"Don't Close Your Eyes" - Kix - 4:17
"Carrie" - Europe - 4:32
"More Than Words" - Extreme - 4:10
"Wind of Change" - Scorpions - 3:43
"Silent Lucidity" - Queensrÿche - 5:46

References

2006 compilation albums
Heavy metal compilation albums
Razor & Tie compilation albums